Dolphins United Football Club is an association football club based in the Philippines.

History
Dolphins United Football Club (formerly PCU Alumni Football Club) is a football organization based in National Capital Region, founded by alumnus of Philippine Christian University (PCU) football team who were student-athletes from the different colleges of PCU. These alumnus were also among those competent student-athletes who brought the gold to their alma mater for three consecutive years during the National Collegiate Athletic Association (NCAA) from year 1999 to year 2001.

On 26 October 2011, Dolphins United Football Club was registered as non-stock/non-profit organization by Securities and Exchange Commission with its eleven appointed board of directors. Dolphins United Football Club has been participating in United Football League (UFL) 2nd Division here in Philippines since 2009 up to present with current ranking of no.11. Under this league, the club is highly visible in our nation's local television specifically on AKTV channel. Aside from United Football League (UFL), DUFC also participated in the following 7-a-side and 11-a-side tournaments; Cavite Football Association (CAFA); AFC – Monfort Cup; Alaska Cup and Coca-Cola Cup. In all of these tournaments, DUFC had managed to reach either top 2 or top 4.

Kit manufacturers and sponsors

Crest

References

Football clubs in the Philippines
Association football clubs established in 1996
1996 establishments in the Philippines
Sports teams in Metro Manila